Angélica Cristine Kvieczynski, better known as Angélica Kvieczynski (born September 1, 1991), is an individual Brazilian rhythmic gymnast. She competed in the 2007 Pan American Games, won a silver medal and three bronze medal in the 2011 Pan American Games, won six gold medals in the 2010 South American Games and won the Prêmio Brasil Olímpico once.
Now she is a coach for junior gymnasts.

Biography
Angélica Kvieczynski was born in Toledo, of Polish, Russian, German and Italian descent. She participated in the 2007 Pan American Games, held in Rio de Janeiro, Brazil, her best position there being the fifth place in the bow modality. Angélica Kvieczynski won gold medals in the 2010 South American Games, held in Medellín, Colombia, in the rhythmic team competition, as well as in the all-around, hoop, rope, clubs and ribbon modalities. She won the Prêmio Brasil Olímpico for best rhythmic gymnast in 2010. Angélica Kvieczinski won a silver medal and three bronze medals in the 2011 Pan American Games, held in Guadalajara, the first bronze medal was won on October 15, 2011 in the all-around modality, the second one on October 17, 2011, in the ball modality, and the last one in the hoop modality, again held on October 17. The silver medal was won in the club modality on October 17.
On September 9–13, Kvieczynski competed at the 2015 World Championships in Stuttgart finishing 54th in the All-around qualifications and did not advance into the Top 24 finals.

References

1991 births
Living people
People from Toledo, Paraná
Brazilian rhythmic gymnasts
Brazilian people of Polish descent
Gymnasts at the 2011 Pan American Games
Gymnasts at the 2015 Pan American Games
Pan American Games silver medalists for Brazil
Pan American Games bronze medalists for Brazil
Pan American Games medalists in gymnastics
South American Games gold medalists for Brazil
South American Games silver medalists for Brazil
South American Games medalists in gymnastics
Competitors at the 2010 South American Games
Competitors at the 2014 South American Games
Medalists at the 2011 Pan American Games
Medalists at the 2015 Pan American Games
Sportspeople from Paraná (state)